The Spartan Events Center is a multipurpose arena in Elgin, Illinois at Elgin Community College and was home to the Elgin Racers.

References

College basketball venues in the United States
Basketball venues in Illinois